Henry Stafford may refer to:

Sir Henry Stafford (c.1425–1471), 3rd husband of Margaret Beaufort, Countess of Richmond and Derby
Henry Stafford, 2nd Duke of Buckingham (1455–1483), executed for conspiring against Richard III
Henry Stafford, 1st Baron Stafford (1501–1563), English baron
Henry Stafford, 2nd Baron Stafford (d. 1566), English baron
Henry Stafford, 1st Earl of Wiltshire (1479–1533), English nobleman, brother of Henry VIII's mistress, Anne Stafford

 Henry Stafford-Jerningham, 9th Baron Stafford (1802-1844)
 Henry Stafford Northcote, 1st Baron Northcote (1846-1911) British politician
 William Henry Stafford (1869-1957) U.S. politician
 William Henry Stafford Jr. (born 1941) U.S. district judge

See also

Stafford (surname)

Harry Stafford (disambiguation)
Stafford (disambiguation)